Donny "The Don" Crevels (born 6 February 1974 in Amsterdam) is a Dutch racing driver. He has raced in such series as Le Mans Series, V8Star Series and the FIA GT Championship.

In 1998, he won the Italian Formula Three Championship with Prema Powerteam. He previously won the 1994 EFDA Nations Cup for his country alongside Tom Coronel at Circuit Park Zandvoort - the pair were runners-up the following year. In 2004, he was the inaugural winner of the BRL V6 touring-car series.

24 Hours of Le Mans results

References

External links
 Official website
 Career statistics from Driver Database

1974 births
Living people
Sportspeople from Amsterdam
Dutch racing drivers
EFDA Nations Cup drivers
24 Hours of Spa drivers
Italian Formula Three Championship drivers
Prema Powerteam drivers
Porsche Carrera Cup Germany drivers